The Chepo River is a river of Panama in the Chepo District of Panama Province. It drains into the Pacific Ocean.

Course
The uppermost reaches of the Chepo is alternately called the Bayano River after the construction of the Bayano Dam that resulted in the  lake reservoir. The headwaters of the Chepo encompass watercourses running south from the San Blas Mountains near the Caribbean along with other rivers draining parts of the Majé and Darien Mountains.

The Mamoni River is a major tributary farther down stream.

Measuring  in length, the Chepo-Bayano is the third longest river of Panama.

Coquira, in the lower reaches, is the main riverine port.

See also
List of rivers of Panama

References

 Rand McNally, The New International Atlas, 1993.
CIA map, 1995.

Rivers of Panama
Gulf of Panama
Geography of Panamá Province
Drainage basins of the Pacific Ocean